Egypt  competed at the 2019 World Aquatics Championships in Gwangju, South Korea from 12 to 28 July.

Medalists

Artistic swimming

Egypt's artistic swimming team consisted of 11 athletes (11 female).

Women

 Legend: (R) = Reserve Athlete

Diving

Egypt has entered five divers.

Men

Women

Mixed

Open water swimming

Egypt has entered two open water swimmers.

Men

Women

Swimming

Egyptian swimmers have achieved qualifying standards in the following events (up to a maximum of 2 swimmers in each event at the A-standard entry time, and 1 at the B-standard)

Egypt has entered eight swimmers.

Men

Women

References

World Aquatics Championships
2019
Nations at the 2019 World Aquatics Championships